Isaac Tondo (born May 2, 1981 in Monrovia) is a Liberian football striker.  He currently plays for LPRC Oilers.

Tondo is also a member of the Liberia national football team.

External links 
 

1981 births
Living people
Liberian footballers
Association football forwards
Sportspeople from Monrovia
Liberia international footballers